Obscuromyia is a genus of tachinid flies in the family Tachinidae from Western Australia.

Species
O. westralica Barraclough & O'Hara 1998

References

Tachininae
Diptera of Australasia
Tachinidae genera